JGR (pronounced 'Jaguar') is a universal and unified Graphical User Interface for the R programming language, licensed under the GNU General Public License.

JGR is a cross-platform stand-alone R terminal, and can be used as a more advanced substitute to the default Rgui (on Windows) or to a simple R session started from a terminal. It provides a friendly R-console complemented by a spreadsheet-like data editor and by a script editor featuring syntax highlighting, autocompletion and (MS Excel-style) arguments-suggestions for entered functions, and direct command transfer.

See also
 R interfaces

References

External links
 JGR on CRAN
 Deducer 
 Home of JGR at GitHub

Free R (programming language) software